The 2010 Ladies European Tour was a series of golf tournaments for elite female golfers from around the world which took place from February through December 2010. The tournaments were sanctioned by the Ladies European Tour (LET).

The tour featured 25 official money events, as well as the European Nations Cup. Lee-Anne Pace won the Order of Merit with earnings of €339,517.77, ahead of Laura Davies. In-Kyung Kim won Rookie of the Year honours, after finishing 4th in the Order of Merit.

Schedule
The table below shows the 2010 schedule. The numbers in brackets after the winners' names show the number of career wins they had on the Ladies European Tour up to and including that event. This is only shown for members of the tour.

Key

Order of Merit rankings

External links
Official site of the Ladies European Tour
Ladies European Tour Information Centre

Ladies European Tour
Ladies European Tour
Ladies European Tour